GIE may refer to:
 Gie, a 2005 Indonesian film
 Government in exile
 Groupement d'intérêt économique, a type of French business consortium
 Noel Gie (born 1977), South African cricketer
 Stefanus Gie, (1884-1945), South African diplomat.